The Men's 800 metre freestyle competition of the 2022 FINA World Swimming Championships (25 m) was held on 17 December 2022.

Records
Prior to the competition, the existing world and championship records were as follows.

The following new records were set during this competition:

Results
The slowest heats were started at 13:12, and the fastest heat at 19:50.

References

Men's 800 metre freestyle